Tibor George Kalman (July 6, 1949 – May 2, 1999) was an American graphic designer of Hungarian origin, well known for his work as editor-in-chief of Colors magazine.

Early life
Kalman was born on July 6, 1949, in Budapest, to parents Marianne I. (née Deezsoffy or Dezsőffi) and George Tibor Kalman. He became a United States resident in 1956, after he and his family fled Hungary to escape the Soviet invasion, settling in Poughkeepsie, New York. Both of his parents had Jewish ethnic roots, and converted to Catholicism to avoid persecution, so 'Kalman only became aware that he was Jewish at the age of 18'.

In 1967, he enrolled in New York University (NYU), dropping out after one year of Journalism classes to travel to Cuba to harvest sugar cane and learn about Cuban culture, as a member of the Venceremos Brigade.

Career
In 1971, Kalman returned to New York City where he was hired by Leonard Riggio for a small bookstore that eventually became Barnes & Noble. He later became the creative director of their in-house design department where he created advertisements, store signs, shopping bags, and the original B&N bookplate trademark. In 1979, Kalman - along with his wife Maira Kalman, Carol Bokuniewicz, and Liz Trovato - started the design firm M & Co., which did corporate work for such diverse clients as the Limited Corporation, the new wave rock group Talking Heads, and Restaurant Florent in New York City's Meatpacking District. He sought to challenge mundane design thinking and aspired to create unpredictable work. Kalman also worked as creative director of Interview magazine in the early 1990s.

By the 1980s, Kalman was known for being 'the 'bad boy' of graphic design' because of his antics and radical consciousness. He believed that award-winning design was only possible when the client was ethical, and frequently called other designers out when he did not agree with their actions. He defined good design as a benefit to everyday life and should be used to increase public awareness of social issues. Kalman adopted a vernacular style as a way to protest corporate International Style which was the primary design style of the time.

Kalman became founding editor-in-chief of the Benetton-sponsored magazine Colors, in 1991. Two years later, Kalman closed M & Co. and moved to Rome, to work exclusively on Colors. Billed as 'a magazine about the rest of the world', Colors focused on multiculturalism and global awareness. This perspective was communicated through bold graphic design, typography, and juxtaposition of photographs and doctored images, including a series in which highly recognizable figures such as the Pope and Queen Elizabeth were depicted as racial minorities.

In 1999, Kalman won the AIGA medal as the 'design profession's moral compass and its most fervent provocateur'.

Personal life
From 1981 up until his death, Kalman was married to the illustrator and author Maira Kalman (née Berman). They met while attending NYU. Together they had two children, Lulu Bodoni and Alex Onomatopoeia.

Death and legacy
The onset of non-Hodgkin's lymphoma forced Kalman to leave Colors in 1995, and return to New York. In 1997, he re-opened M & Co. and continued to work until his death on May 2, 1999, in Vega Alta, Puerto Rico.

Tibor Kalman: Perverse Optimist, a book about Kalman's work and that with M&Co, was published by Princeton Architectural Press in 1999.

See also 
 First Things First 2000 manifesto
 List of AIGA medalists
 Colors
 Naked
 Remain in Light

References

External links 
 Tibor Kalman in Artfacts
 
 Art Directors Club biography, portrait and images of work
 Tibor Kalman on Pata Magazine
 Kalman's works in the collection of the Cooper-Hewitt, National Design Museum

1949 births
1999 deaths
AIGA medalists
American graphic designers
American magazine founders
American people of Hungarian-Jewish descent
Hungarian illustrators
20th-century American businesspeople